Pietro Maggi (Milan, circa 1680 - Milan, before 1738) was an Italian painter of the late-Baroque period.

Biography 
He was influenced by Carlo Francesco Nuvolone (died 1702) but studied and worked with Filippo Abbiati. Together they painted frescoes (1707) for the cupola of San Nazaro in Brolo (Milan). His other fresco was the Night of Hercules (or Heracles) and Hebe (Le nozze di Ercole e Ebe) at the upper hall in the Palazzo Durini in Milan. Other works of Maggi include a Madonna and St Joseph (1713) for the church of San Guadenzio in Varallo Sesia an Assumption of the Virgin for the church of Santa Maria dei Crociferi in Milan, and a Resurrection for the church of Santa Maria di Canepanova in Pavia.

References

Simonetta Coppa, "La pittura del Seicento e del Settecento", R. Conti, Monza. Il duomo e i suoi tesori, vol. II, Milan 1989, p. 245, 259.
Simonetta Coppa, "Il rinnovamento artistico del duomo di Monza dall'età dei Borromei alla fine dell'ancien régime. Le fonti, lo stato degli studi e le nuove prospettive di ricerca", R. Cassanelli - R. Conti, Il duomo di Monza (Monza Cathedral). Itinerario barocco, Milan 1995, p. 59.
Simonetta Coppa, "Il Seicento e il Settecento", C. Capponi, S. Ambrogio Basilica, Milan, Milan 1997, p. 84-93.
V. Caprara, "Pietro Maggi", R. Cassanelli - R. Cont, Il duomo di Monza (Monza Cathedral). Itinerario barocco, Milan 1995, p. 162.

External links

1680s births
1730s deaths
18th-century Italian painters
17th-century Italian painters
Italian male painters
Italian Baroque painters
Painters from Milan
18th-century Italian male artists